Yengi Qaleh (also Romanized as Yengī Qal‘eh; also known as Bengeh Qal‘eh) is a village in Qara Bashlu Rural District, Chapeshlu District, Dargaz County, Razavi Khorasan Province, Iran. At the 2006 census, its population was 428, in 104 families.

References 

Populated places in Dargaz County